A papal coronation is the formal ceremony of the placing of the papal tiara on a newly elected pope. The first recorded papal coronation was of Pope Nicholas I in 858. The most recent was the 1963 coronation of Paul VI, who soon afterwards abandoned the practice of wearing the tiara. To date, none of his successors have used the tiara, and their papal inauguration celebrations have included no coronation ceremony, although the current or any future pope may elect to restore the use of the tiara at any point during his pontificate.

The papal inauguration celebration, with or without a coronation, has only symbolic significance, as a pope assumes office immediately on giving his consent to a valid election.

In Spanish, the term  (English: "pontifical coronation") is sometimes used for the canonical coronation of religious images through a formal, expressed decree by a reigning pope.

Ritual

When a conclave elects a new pope, he assumes all of the rights and authority of the papacy immediately upon his acceptance of election; however, popes traditionally numbered their regnal years from the date of their coronation. If a newly elected pope is not a bishop, he is consecrated at once. In accordance with tradition, the right of consecration belongs to the dean of the College of Cardinals, in his absence to the subdean, and in the absence of both of these to the senior cardinal bishop. If the new pope is already a bishop, as is normally the case, his election is announced immediately to the people gathered in Saint Peter's Square and he gives them his blessing.

The episcopal enthronement of the pope takes place in his cathedral, the Archbasilica of St. John Lateran. This ceremony was once combined with the coronation. During the Avignon papacy, the pope, being in France, could not be enthroned in his cathedral in Rome. The coronations continued, while enthronements had to await a return to Rome. When Gregory XI did return to Rome, the Lateran Palace was badly in need of repair, so the popes made the Vatican their residence and transferred coronations to Saint Peter's Basilica. The Lateran Basilica remains the cathedral of Rome, and the enthronement occurs there. During the "prisoner in the Vatican" period, the enthronement did not take place.

Coronation Mass
The coronation took place on the first Sunday or Holy Day following the election. It began with a solemn Papal Mass. During the chanting of Terce, he sat on a throne and all of the cardinals made what was called their "first obeisance" to him, approaching one by one and kissing his hand. Then the archbishops and bishops approached and kissed his feet.

Following this, at least from the beginning of the 16th century, the newly elected pope was carried in state through St. Peter's Basilica on the sedia gestatoria under a white canopy, with the papal flabella (ceremonial fans) to either side. Instead of the papal tiara, he wore a jewelled mitre (the episcopal mitra pretiosa). Three times, the procession was stopped, and a bundle of flax lashed to a gilded staff was burnt before the newly elected pontiff, while a master of ceremonies said: Pater Sancte, sic transit gloria mundi (Holy Father, thus passes the glory of the world) as a symbolic reminder to set aside materialism and vanity. Once at the high altar, he would begin to celebrate Solemn High Mass with full papal ceremonial.

After the Confiteor, the pope was seated on the sedia gestatoria, which was resting on the ground, and the three senior cardinal bishops approached him wearing mitres. Each in turn placed his hands above him and said the prayer, Super electum Pontificem (over the elected pope). First the Cardinal Bishop of Albano said:God, who are present without distinction whenever the devout mind invokes you, be present, we ask you, we and this your servant, __, who to the summit of the apostolic community has been chosen as the judge of your people, infuse with the highest blessings that he experience your gift who has reached this point.

Then the Cardinal Bishop of Porto said:We supplicate you, Almighty God, effect your customary devotion and pour out on this your servant, __, the grace of the Holy Spirit that he who is constituted at the head of our church as the servant of the mystery, you would strengthen with the fullness of virtue.

Finally the Cardinal Bishop of Ostia said:God, who willed your Apostle Peter to hold first place in the inner fellowship of the apostles, that universal Christianity overcome evil, look propitiously we ask on this your servant, __, who from a humble position has suddenly been enthroned with the apostles on this same principal sublimity, that just as he has been raised to this exalted dignity, so may he likewise merit to accumulate virtue; in bearing the burden of the universal church, help him, make him worthy and for thee who are blessed may merits replace vices.

Then, the senior cardinal deacon placed the pallium on his shoulders saying: Accept the pallium, representing the plenitude of the Pontifical office, to the honour of Almighty God, and the most glorious Virgin Mary, his Mother, and the Blessed Apostles Peter and Paul, and the Holy Roman Church.“Accipe pallium, plenitudinem scilicet pontificalis officii, ad honorem omnipotentis Dei et gloriosissimae Virginis eius genitricis et beatorum apostolorum Petri et Pauli et sanctae Romanae ecclesiae.”

In the 11th and 12th centuries, the immantatio, or bestowal of the mantum (a papal vestment consisting of a very long red cope fastened with an elaborate morse) on the newly elected pope was regarded as especially symbolic of investiture with papal authority, and was conferred with the words: "I invest thee with the Roman papacy, that thou rule over the city and the world."

After the investiture with the pallium, the pope incensed the high altar and then went to the throne, placed on the choir side, between the Altar of the Confession and the Altar of the Chair, and there, during the singing of the Kyrie, he received again the obeisance of the cardinals, archbishops and bishops. Then the Mass continued. After the Gloria in excelsis and the Pax vobis, the pope said the Collect for the day and then secretly a prayer for himself. After the pope had returned again to his seat the Papal Laudes were chanted:

As with all Papal High Masses, the Epistle and the Gospel were read in both Greek and Latin and the pope communicated at his throne.

Coronation 
 
After the Mass, the new pope was crowned with the papal tiara. This frequently took place on the balcony of St. Peter's Basilica, overlooking the crowds gathered in St. Peter's Square. The pope was seated on a throne with the flabella to either side of him. After the Dean of the College of Cardinals recited a few prayers, including the Lord's Prayer and a collect, the senior cardinal deacon, the protodeacon, removed the pope's mitre and placed the tiara on his head with the words:

Following his coronation, the pope imparted the solemn papal blessing Urbi et Orbi.

Taking possession of the cathedral of the Bishop of Rome

The last act of the inauguration of a new pope is still the formal taking possession (possessio) of his cathedra as Bishop of Rome in the Archbasilica of St. John Lateran. This is the final ceremony mentioned in Pope John Paul II's Apostolic Constitution on the vacancy of the Apostolic See and the election of the Roman pontiff. The pope is enthroned in the same manner as other bishops. He is solemnly conducted to the episcopal throne, and takes possession by seating himself on it. He receives the kiss of peace and listens to the reading of a passage of Holy Scripture, whereupon he pronounces an address that used to be called the sermo inthronisticus.

In ancient times, the letters that the pope sent to the patriarchs in token of being in communion with them in the same faith were called litterae inthronisticae or syllabai enthronistikai.

Location of the ceremony

The earliest papal coronations took place in St. John Lateran, the pope's cathedral. However, for hundreds of years papal coronations have traditionally taken place in the environs of St. Peter's Basilica, though a number of coronations took place in Avignon, during the Avignon papacy. Earlier, Pope Celestine V was twice crowned in L'Aquila. In 1800 Pope Pius VII was crowned in the crowded church of the Benedictine island monastery of San Giorgio, Venice, after his late predecessor, Pope Pius VI, had been forced into temporary exile during Napoleon Bonaparte's capture of Rome. Since the French seized the tiara along with the previous pope, he was crowned with a papier-mâché tiara, for which the ladies of Venice gave up their jewels.

All coronations after 1800 took place in Rome. Leo XIII was crowned in the Sistine Chapel, due to fears that anti-clerical mobs, inspired by Italian unification, might attack the Basilica and disrupt the ceremony. Benedict XV was also crowned in the chapel in 1914. Pius XI was crowned at the dais in front of the High Altar in St. Peter's Basilica. Popes Pius IX, Pius XII, and John XXIII all were crowned in public on the balcony of the basilica, facing crowds assembled below in St. Peter's Square. Paul VI was crowned in front of St Peter's on a special dais with the entire coronation ceremony outdoors, as St Peter's was filled with special seating for the Vatican Council sessions.

Pius XII's 1939 coronation broke new ground by being the first to be filmed and the first to be broadcast live on radio. The ceremony, which lasted for six hours, was attended by leading dignitaries; these included the heir to the Italian throne, the Prince of Piedmont, former kings Ferdinand I of Bulgaria and Alfonso XIII of Spain, the 16th Duke of Norfolk (representing King George VI of the United Kingdom), and the Irish Taoiseach, Éamon de Valera, the last two being in evening dress (white tie and tails).

Paul VI and the coronation

The last pope to be crowned was Pope Paul VI. He decided to cease wearing a papal tiara and laid his own on the altar of St. Peter's Basilica in a gesture of humility. His 1975 apostolic constitution, Romano Pontifici Eligendo prescribed that "the new pontiff is to be crowned by the senior cardinal deacon".

His successor, Pope John Paul I, opted not to be crowned and to have instead a less elaborate "solemn Mass to mark the start of his ministry as Supreme Pastor" in September 1978.

John Paul II and the coronation

After John Paul I's sudden death following a thirty-three-day reign, the new pope, John Paul II, opted to copy his predecessor's ceremony without coronation. In his homily at his inauguration Mass, he said that Paul VI had "left his successors free to decide" whether to wear the papal tiara. He went on:

John Paul II's 1996 Apostolic Constitution, Universi Dominici gregis, now in force, does not specify the form that the "solemn ceremony of the inauguration of the pontificate" of a new pope should take, whether with or without a coronation.

A number of papal tiaras are available for a future pope to use.

List of papal coronations 1143–1963

See also
Index of Vatican City-related articles

Notes

Further reading 

 "The Coronation of Pope Leo XIII" an account from Catholic world

External links 

 Video highlights from Pius XII's 1939 coronation